Selected Stories of Philip K. Dick is a collection of science fiction stories by Philip K. Dick.  It was first published by Random House in 2002.  Many of the stories had originally appeared in the magazines Planet Stories, Fantasy and Science Fiction, Imagination, Space Science Fiction, Astounding, Beyond Fantasy Fiction, Orbit, Galaxy Science Fiction, Fantastic Universe, Amazing Stories, Rolling Stone College Papers, Omni and Playboy.

Contents
 Introduction, by Jonathan Lethem
 "Beyond Lies the Wub"
 "Roog"
 "Paycheck"
 "Second Variety"
 "Impostor"
 "The King of the Elves"
 "Adjustment Team"
 "Foster, You're Dead!"
 "Upon the Dull Earth"
 "Autofac"
 "The Minority Report"
 "The Days of Perky Pat"
 "Precious Artifact"
 "A Game of Unchance"
 "We Can Remember It for You Wholesale"
 "Faith of Our Fathers"
 "The Electric Ant"
 "A Little Something for Us Tempunauts"
 "The Exit Door Leads In"
 "Rautavaara's Case"
 "I Hope I Shall Arrive Soon"

References

2002 short story collections
Short story collections by Philip K. Dick